Sint Philipsland is a former island in the Dutch province of Zeeland. Nowadays it is part of the municipality of Tholen.

It contains the villages of Sint Philipsland and Anna Jacobapolder, and also the hamlet of De Sluis.

Peninsulas of the Netherlands
Former islands of Zeeland
Regions of Zeeland
Tholen